The 2013 Georgia Bulldogs football team represented the University of Georgia in the 2013 NCAA Division I FBS football season. They were led by head coach Mark Richt, who was in his thirteenth year as head coach. The Bulldogs played their home games at Sanford Stadium. They were a member of the Eastern Division of the Southeastern Conference.

ESPN's College GameDay aired live from the university campus on September 28, 2013 before the Bulldogs played LSU.

Personnel

Coaching staff

Schedule

Depth chart

Rankings

References

Georgia
Georgia Bulldogs football seasons
Georgia Bulldogs football